{{Infobox song contest national year
| Year = 2020
| Country = Georgia
| Preselection = Artist: Georgian IdolSong: Internal selection
| Preselection date = Georgian Idol:Audition shows:26 October 20192 November 20199 November 2019Live shows:16 November 201923 November 201930 November 20197 December 201914 December 201921 December 2019Final:31 December 2019Song:3 March 2020| Entrant = Tornike Kipiani
| Song = Take Me as I Am
| Writer = 
| Final result = Contest cancelled
}}
Georgia originally planned to participate in the Eurovision Song Contest 2020 with the song "Take Me as I Am" written and performed by Tornike Kipiani, who was selected through the reality television show Georgian Idol, held by the Georgian broadcaster Georgian Public Broadcaster (GPB). The competition resulted in the selection of four finalists for the final on 31 December 2019. The results of a public vote exclusively resulted in the selection of Tornike Kipiani as the winner. The song that Tornike Kipiani would perform, "Take Me as I Am", was presented to the public on 3 March 2020.

Georgia was drawn to compete in the second semi-final of the Eurovision Song Contest which took place on 14 May 2020. However, the contest was cancelled due to the COVID-19 pandemic.

Background

Prior to the 2020 Contest, Georgia had participated in the Eurovision Song Contest thirteen times since their first entry in 2007. The nation's highest placing in the contest, to this point, has been ninth place, which was achieved on two occasions: in 2010 with the song "Shine" performed by Sofia Nizharadze and in 2011 with the song "One More Day" performed by Eldrine. The nation briefly withdrew from the contest in 2009 after the European Broadcasting Union (EBU) rejected the Georgian entry, "We Don't Wanna Put In", for perceived political references to Vladimir Putin who was the Russian Prime Minister at the time. The withdrawal and fallout was tied to tense relations between Georgia and then host country Russia, which stemmed from the 2008 Russo-Georgian War. Following the introduction of semi-finals, Georgia has, to this point, failed to qualify to the final on five occasions. In , Georgia failed to qualify to the final with the song "Keep On Going" performed by Oto Nemsadze.

The Georgian national broadcaster, Georgian Public Broadcaster (GPB), broadcasts the event within Georgia and organises the selection process for the nation's entry. GPB confirmed their intentions to participate at the 2020 Eurovision Song Contest on 9 June 2019. Georgia has selected their entry for the Eurovision Song Contest both through national finals and internal selections in the past. In 2019, the Georgian entry was selected via the reality television show Georgian Idol. For their 2020 participation, the artist was selected through Georgian Idol, while the song was selected internally by the broadcaster.

Before Eurovision
Georgian Idol
The Georgian artist for the Eurovision Song Contest 2020 was selected through the ninth season of Georgian Idol, the Georgian version of the reality television singing competition format Idols created by Simon Fuller. The competition premiered on 26 October 2019 and concluded with a final on 31 December 2019. All shows in the competition were hosted by Ruska Makashvili with the live shows taking place at the Tbilisi Concert Hall in Tbilisi, broadcast on the GPB First Channel as well as online at the broadcaster's website 1tv.ge.

 Judges 
A four-member judging panel determined the contestants that would advance to the live shows and commented on the contestants' performances during the live shows. The judging panel consisted of:

 Tinatin Berdzenishvili – Director General of GPB and Head of EBU Gender Balance Initiative
 David Evgenidze – Songwriter and music producer of the GPB First Channel
 Natia Todua – Singer
  – Pianist

 Contestant progress in the live shows Colour key'''

Shows

Audition shows 
GPB opened a public application from 26 July 2019 until 15 September 2019, with applicants attending preliminary auditions held in Tbilisi, Kutaisi and Batumi. Following the audition shows in front of the judging panel, aired between 26 October 2019 and 9 November 2019, 36 contestants were shortlisted and the judges selected the top ten contestants that would progress to the live shows, which were announced on 10 November 2019.

Live shows 
One contestant was eliminated during each of the first six live shows between 16 November 2019 and 21 December 2019. The results of the live shows were determined exclusively by a public vote through televoting and voting via Facebook messenger.

Final 
Each of the four remaining contestants performed during the final live show on 31 December 2019. The winner, Tornike Kipiani, was determined exclusively by a public vote through televoting and voting via Facebook messenger.

Song selection 
Tornike Kipiani's song was internally selected by a five-member expert commission consisting of Giorgi Asanishvili, Lana Kutateladze, Davit Evgenidze, Natia Mshvenieradze and Natia Uznadze. Kipiani worked with Georgian producer Aleko Berdzenishvili to record the selected song at the Bravo Records Studios in Tbilisi. The song "Take Me as I Am", written and composed by Tornike Kipiani himself, premiered on 3 March 2020 together with the music video on the GPB First Channel programme , hosted by Helen Kalandadze. The music video was directed by Temo Kvirkvelia.

At Eurovision 
According to Eurovision rules, all nations with the exceptions of the host country and the "Big Five" (France, Germany, Italy, Spain and the United Kingdom) are required to qualify from one of two semi-finals in order to compete for the final; the top ten countries from each semi-final progress to the final. The European Broadcasting Union (EBU) split up the competing countries into six different pots based on voting patterns from previous contests, with countries with favourable voting histories put into the same pot. On 28 January 2020, a special allocation draw was held which placed each country into one of the two semi-finals, as well as which half of the show they would perform in. Georgia was placed into the second semi-final, which was to be held on 14 May 2020, and was scheduled to perform in the second half of the show. However, due to 2019-20 pandemic of Coronavirus, the contest was cancelled.

During the Eurovision Song Celebration YouTube broadcast in place of the semi-finals, it was revealed that Georgia was set to perform in position 16, following the entry from Portugal and before the entry from Bulgaria.

References

External links 
 Georgian Idol YouTube channel (in Georgian)
 Official Georgia in Eurovision website
 Official Georgian Idol website (in Georgian)

2020
Countries in the Eurovision Song Contest 2020
Eurovision